The Mixed synchronized 3 metre springboard competition at the 2019 World Aquatics Championships was held on 20 July 2019.

Results
The final was started at 15:30.

References

Mixed synchronized 3 metre springboard
World Aquatics Championships